Ulaka is a small village west of Velike Lašče in central Slovenia. The Municipality of Velike Lašče is part of the traditional region of Lower Carniola and is included in the Central Slovenia Statistical Region.

A small chapel-shrine in the centre of the settlement dates to 1882.

References

External links
Ulaka on Geopedia

Populated places in the Municipality of Velike Lašče